The Golden Rose Stakes is an Australian Turf Club Group 1 Thoroughbred horse race for three-year-olds, run at set weights, over a distance of 1,400 metres at Rosehill Racecourse, Sydney, Australia.  Previously run in late August or early September, the race is now run on the fourth Saturday in September. Total prizemoney for the race is A$1 million.

History
The initial race was named after the dual Melbourne Cup winner Peter Pan (1932, 1934).

When the race was renamed in 2003 the race had its grade dropped from Grade 2 to an unlisted race even though the stakes of the race were increased to $1 million.

Name
 1978–2002 - Peter Pan Stakes
 2003 onwards - Golden Rose Stakes

Grade
 1978 - Principal Race
 1979–2002 - Group 2
 2003–2004 - Unlisted Race (stakes $1 million)
 2005 - Listed Race
 2006 - Group 3
 2008 - Group 2
 2009 onwards - Group 1

Distance
 1978–1986 – 1500 metres
 1987 – 1350 metres
 1988 – 1500 metres
 1989–1991 – 1550 metres
 1992–2002 – 1500 metres
 2003 - onwards 1400 metres

Venue
 1989–1991 - Race held at Canterbury Park

Winners

Golden Rose Stakes 

 2022 - Jacquinot
 2021 - In The Congo 
 2020 - Ole Kirk 
 2019 - Bivouac 
 2018 - The Autumn Sun
 2017 - Trapeze Artist
 2016 - Astern
 2015 - Exosphere
 2014 - Hallowed Crown
 2013 - Zoustar
 2012 - Epaulette
 2011 - Manawanui
 2010 - Toorak Toff
 2009 - Denman
 2008 - Duporth
 2008 - Forensics
 2007 - †race not held
 2006 - Court Command
 2005 - Paratroopers
 2004 - Doonan
 2003 - In Top Swing 

† Race not held in that year due to Equine Influenza outbreak. The Sydney Turf Club moved the race to the autumn for the 2007–08 racing season and the race was won by Forensics in March 2008.

Peter Pan Stakes 

 2002 - Sportsman
 2001 - Magic Albert
 2000 - Dandify
 1999 - Fairway
 1998 - Huge Jet
 1997 - On Air
 1996 - race not held 
 1995 - Flying Spur
 1994 - Brave Warrior
 1993 - March Hare
 1992 - Play Or Pay
 1991 - Big Dreams
 1990 - Imperial Magician
 1989 - Party Mood
 1988 - Swiftly Carson
 1987 - Roman General
 1986 - Drought
 1985 - Handy Proverb
 1984 - Black Ivory
 1983 - Sir Dapper
 1982 - Cossack Prince
 1981 - Best Western
 1980 - Impish Prince 
 1979 - Kingston Town 
 1978 - Kapalaran

See also
 List of Australian Group races
 Group races

External links 
 Golden Rose (ATC)

References

Group 1 stakes races in Australia